Mount Webster is a mountain located on the border between Coos County and Carroll County, New Hampshire. The mountain, formerly called Notch Mountain, is named after Daniel Webster (1782–1852), and is the south-westernmost of the Presidential Range of the White Mountains. Mount Webster is flanked to the northeast by Mount Jackson; to the southwest it faces Mount Willey across Crawford Notch.

The west face of Mount Webster drains directly into the Saco River, thence into the Gulf of Maine at Saco, Maine. The north and southeast faces drain into the Saco via Silver Cascade and Webster Brook respectively.

Mount Webster is on the western boundary of the Presidential Range - Dry River Wilderness. The Appalachian Trail, a 2,170-mile (3,500-km) National Scenic Trail from Georgia to Maine, runs along the ridge of the Presidentials, across the summit of Webster.

Gallery

See also 

 List of mountains in New Hampshire
 White Mountain National Forest

External links 
 
 Mount Webster on Topozone
  PeakBagger.com: Mount Webster
  summitpost.org: Mount Webster

Mountains of New Hampshire
White Mountains (New Hampshire)
Mountains of Coös County, New Hampshire
Mountains of Carroll County, New Hampshire
Mountains on the Appalachian Trail